The 1964 Ballon d'Or, given to the best football player in Europe as judged by a panel of sports journalists from UEFA member countries, was awarded to Denis Law from Manchester United, the first Scotsman to win the honour.

Rankings

References
RSSSF.com

External links
 Official Ballon d'Or 1964 page

1964
1964–65 in European football